The 2019–20 Big 12 men's basketball season began with practices in October 2019, followed by the start of the 2019–20 NCAA Division I men's basketball season in November. Regular season conference play started in December 2019 and concluded in March 2019. The Big 12 tournament was scheduled to be held from March 11 through 14 and will be played at the Sprint Center in Kansas City, Missouri, but it was cancelled after the first round due to the coronavirus pandemic.

Coaches

Coaching changes 
There were no head coaching changes following the 2018–19 Big 12 Conference men's basketball season.

Head coaches 
Note: Stats are through the beginning of the season. All stats and records are from time at current school only.

Preseason

Big 12 Preseason Poll

Pre-Season All-Big 12 Team

Player of the Year: Udoka Azubuike, Kansas
Newcomer of the Year: Chris Clarke, Texas Tech
Freshman of the Year: Oscar Tshiebwe, West Virginia

Rankings

Regular season

Conference matrix

Big12/SEC Challenge

Postseason

Big 12 Tournament

All 10 conference teams will participate in the tournament. The top six teams earn a first round bye.
	
Teams will be seeded by record within the conference, with a tiebreaker system to seed teams with identical conference records.

Bracket

Honors and awards

All-Big 12 awards and teams

Phillips 66 Big 12 Men’s Basketball Weekly Awards

See also
 2019–20 NCAA Division I men's basketball season
 Big 12 Conference
 Big 12/SEC Challenge

References